Victor Alexandre Frederic Laloux (15 November 1850 – 13 July 1937) was a French Beaux-Arts architect and teacher.

Life 

Born in Tours, Laloux studied at the Paris École des Beaux-Arts atelier of Louis-Jules André, with his studies interrupted by the Franco-Prussian War, and was awarded the annual Prix de Rome in 1878. He spent 1879 through 1882 at the Villa Medici in Rome.

On his return to France Laloux rose quickly through the academic system, serving on many juries, societies and foundations. As practitioner, he produced major commissions in a highly ornamented neo-classical surface style, collaborating with sculptors and muralists squarely in the Beaux-Arts tradition, but doing so on innovative cast-iron frames. Metal framing allowed higher interior spaces, more generous fenestration, and glass roofs, notably in the sunlit barrel-vault of the Gare d'Orsay.

Laloux was awarded the American AIA Gold Medal in 1922, and the RIBA Royal Gold Medal in 1929. In 1932 he was elected into the National Academy of Design as an Honorary Corresponding Academician. In 1936, the year before his death, his successor as head of the atelier was his own student, Charles Lemaresquier.  He died in Paris, aged 86.

Work 

Laloux's work includes:

 the neo-Byzantine Basilica of St. Martin, Tours, in Tours, 1886–1924 – a project with some political connotations as it was built to replace an earlier Basilica destroyed during the French Revolution. 
 Gare de Tours, in Tours, 1896–1898, with four allegorical limestone statues of cities by Jean Antoine Injalbert (Bordeaux and Toulouse) and Jean-Baptiste Hugues (Limoges and Nantes)
 the Paris Gare d'Orsay, now the Musée d'Orsay, 1900
 Hotel de Ville, Roubaix, with architectural sculpture by Alphonse-Amédée Cordonnier, 1903
 Hôtel de Ville, Tours,  with sculpture by Injalbert, Hugues, Cordonnier and others, 1904
 completion of the Crédit Lyonnais headquarters, Paris, 1913
 the U.S. Embassy, Paris, with his student, American architect William Delano, 1931
 Palais du Hanovre, Paris, with his student Charles Lemaresquier, 1932

Influence 

As professor, Laloux assumed the direction of Louis-Jules André's atelier when André died in 1890.  Laloux would ultimately train about 600 students through the years, including 132 Americans.  Laloux had the distinction of training the greatest number of American students at the Ecole, with Jean-Louis Pascal in second place.  Laloux's influence is visible in the U.S. in buildings like the 1921 San Francisco City Hall.

Atelier training in the context of the École focused on the annual Prix de Rome competition, and by this measure Laloux was also the school's most successful teacher, training 16 winners.  At Laloux's death in 1937 his student and partner Charles Lemaresquier succeeded him as head of the studio.

The students educated in Laloux's atelier include:

 Arthur Brown, Jr., American
 Charles Weeks of Weeks and Day, American
 Duiliu Marcu, Romanian
 François-Benjamin Chaussemiche, French
 George Howe, American
 George Shepard Chappell, American
 , French
 Guillaume Tronchet, French
 Gustave Louis Jaulmes, French
 , French
 Hippolyte Delaporte, French
 Jacques Carlu, French
 Jacques Debat-Ponsan, French
 John Walter Cross of Cross and Cross, American
 José Marques da Silva, Portuguese
 Lucien Weissenburger, French
 Miguel Ventura Terra, Portuguese
 Robert Touzin (fr), French
 William Delano, American
 William Lawrence Bottomley, American
 William Van Alen, American, designer of the Chrysler Building

External links

online biography

References 

19th-century French architects
20th-century French architects
1850 births
1937 deaths
People from Tours, France
Prix de Rome for architecture
Academic staff of the École des Beaux-Arts
École des Beaux-Arts alumni
Recipients of the Royal Gold Medal
Members of the Académie des beaux-arts
Railway architects
Recipients of the AIA Gold Medal